Prospero Caterini (15 October 1795, in Onano – 28 October 1881, in Rome) was an Italian cardinal.

Biography

Prospero Caterini was born in Onano, diocese of Acquapendente in the region of Lazio in what was then the Papal States.  His parents were Francesco Caterini and Maria Domenica Pacelli both from noble families. Prospero's paternal aunt, Maria Antonia Caterini was married to another Pacelli, Gaetano Pacelli thus making Prospero Caterini a relative to the Pacelli family on both his mother's and father's sides.  Maria Antonia Caterini and Gaetano Pacelli were the parents of Marcantonio Pacelli, who served as minister of finance for Pope Gregory XVI and deputy minister of interior  under Pope Pius IX from 1851 to 1870 and also founded the newspaper L’Osservatore Romano on 20 July 1860. In 1939, Eugenio Pacelli, one of Marcantonio's grandsons was elected to the papacy as Pope Pius XII.

The Caterinis themselves traced their nobility to the Cattanei or Cattaneo family, specifically to Gualdo Cattaneo whose family were the Counts of Aversa in 1520.  The name "Caterini" was taken due to the family's devotion to St. Catherine of Alexandria. Those with the surname Caterini later became part of the nobility of Nocera Umbra, Acquapendente and Onano.

Near Grotte di Castro in the vicinity of Lake Bolsena, the Caterini family had a castle, the Castle of Santa Cristina where the young seminarian Eugenio Pacelli, the future Pope Pius XII would spend his holidays in the company of the Pacelli-Caterini families.

Prospero Caterini completed his studies in Rome.   No information has been found as to his ordination history.   He served as the substitute secretary of the Sacred Congregation Consistorial and was later the Secretary of the Sacred Congregation of Studies.  From 1 March 1841 to 28 November 1845, he was Auditor Santissimi.  He was a canon of Saint Peter's Basilica and became an Assessor of the Sacred Congregation of the Inquisition.

Pope Pius IX created him a cardinal on 7 March 1853 and three days later on 10 March, the new cardinal received the red hat and the title of Cardinal-Deacon of Santa Maria della Scala.  He became Cardinal-Protodeacon on 6 November 1876 upon the death of the incumbent protodeacon Cardinal Giacomo Antonelli.  On 18 December 1876, he opted for and received the title of Cardinal-Deacon of Santa Maria in Via Lata previously held by the late Cardinal Antonelli while retaining in commendam the title to the deaconry of Santa Maria della Scala.  On 21 December 1876, he became secretary of the Inquisition.

Prospero Caterini participated as a cardinal-elector in the conclave of 1878.  As protodeacon, he announced at the end of the conclave the election of Cardinal Gioacchino Pecci as Pope Leo XIII. Due to illness however, he was unable to crown the new pope at his papal coronation, the honor instead went to Cardinal Teodolfo Mertel.

He died on 28 October 1881 and after the wake held at his deaconry, was buried at the chapel of the confraternity of the Most Precious Blood in Campo Verano cemetery in Rome.

See also

 Our Lady of La Salette

Notes

References

Bibliography
 Caterini Carlo. Gens Catherina de terra Balii. Edizioni Scientifiche Calabresi.Rende 2009.

External links
The Cardinals of the Holy Roman Church
Catholic Hierarchy 

|-

|-

|-

19th-century Italian cardinals
Cardinals created by Pope Pius IX
Protodeacons
Our Lady of La Salette
1795 births
1881 deaths
Members of the Holy Office
Members of the Sacred Congregation of the Council